Mary Michelle Pennefather (born c. 1966), now known as Sister Rose Marie of the Queen of Angels, is a former professional basketball player. Winner of the Wade Trophy in 1987, she went on to play premier league basketball in Japan before retiring to a monastic life.

High school
Pennefather spent three years at Bishop Machebeuf Catholic High School in Denver, Colorado and one at Notre Dame High School in Utica, New York. She led Machebeuf to three consecutive state championships and a 70–0 record. She led Notre Dame to a 26–0 record, also winning the state championship making for a no loss record for her entire high school career.

Pennefather was named to the Parade All-American High School Basketball Team. She was a U.S. Olympic Festival selection in 1981 and 1983. She turned out for the USA Women's R. William Jones Cup Team in 1982 where she earned a silver medal.

College
Pennefather played her college basketball for the Villanova Wildcats at Villanova University in Radnor Township, Pennsylvania. She was the school's all-time leading scorer for both women and men with a career total of 2,408 points. She was the Big East Player of The Year three times. She was a First Team All-American selection in 1987, and the winner of the coveted Wade Trophy.

Villanova statistics
Source

Professional career
After graduating from Villanova, Pennefather played three seasons of professional basketball for the Nippon Express in Japan.

Religious life
On June 8, 1991, Pennefather retired to a monastic life with the Poor Clares order at their monastery in Alexandria, Virginia. On June 6, 1997, six years after entering the monastery as a novice, Pennefather, now known as Sister Rose Marie, took her final vows as a nun. On June 9, 2019, Pennefather had her first physical contact with family and friends since becoming a nun; her next opportunity to do so will not happen for another 25 years, per the rules of her religious order.

References

External links
Profile at the Greater Utica Sports Hall of Fame
Profile at Machebeuf.org
The Former Villanova basketball star who gave up hoops to join a monastery | SC Featured via YouTube

1960s births
Living people
20th-century American Roman Catholic nuns
21st-century American Roman Catholic nuns
All-American college women's basketball players
American expatriate basketball people in Japan
American women's basketball players
Basketball players from Denver
Forwards (basketball)
Parade High School All-Americans (girls' basketball)
Poor Clares
Villanova Wildcats women's basketball players